Ambulyx montana is a species of moth of the  family Sphingidae. It is known from Thailand, Vietnam and Burma.

It is similar to Ambulyx semiplacida but larger, with a more elongated forewing and paler grey. Furthermore, the forewing upperside subbasal spot posterior to the cell is smaller, the basal area of the hindwing upperside is shaded with grey at least to the medial line and along the inner margin of the tornus.

References

Ambulyx
Moths described in 1990
Moths of Asia